Erich Römer (2 June 1894 – 26 March 1987) was a German ice hockey player, born in Berlin, who competed in the 1928 Winter Olympics and 1932 Winter Olympics.

In 1928 he was a member of the German ice hockey team, which placed last in his preliminary group of the Olympic tournament and did not advance.

Four years later he was a member of the German ice hockey team, which won the bronze medal. He played all six matches.

External links
profile

1894 births
1987 deaths
Ice hockey people from Berlin
Germany men's national ice hockey team coaches
Olympic ice hockey players of Germany
Ice hockey players at the 1928 Winter Olympics
Ice hockey players at the 1932 Winter Olympics
Olympic bronze medalists for Germany
Berliner SC players
Olympic medalists in ice hockey
Medalists at the 1932 Winter Olympics